McIntyre is an unincorporated community in Indiana County, Pennsylvania, United States. McIntyre has a post office, with ZIP code 15756.

References

Unincorporated communities in Indiana County, Pennsylvania
Unincorporated communities in Pennsylvania